Clifton Alexander Woodrum (April 27, 1887 – October 6, 1950) was a Virginia pharmacist, lawyer and U.S. Representative from Roanoke who was considered a Progressive Democrat for his support of President Franklin D. Roosevelt.

Early and family life
Born in Roanoke, Virginia, to Robert H. and  Anna T. Woodrum, years after his brother Robert J. Woodrum and sister Claudine J. Woodrum, Clifton Woodrum attended the local public schools. He later attended the University College of Medicine (now combined with the Medical College of Virginia) in Richmond, Virginia. He married Martha Lena Woodrum, formerly of Texas. They had a son, Clifton A. Woodrum Jr. (1910–1959), and a daughter, Martha Anne Woodrum Zillhardt (1916–2002).

Careers
Woodrum became a registered pharmacist and engaged in his profession in Roanoke. He also followed his father's example, studied law at Washington and Lee University, Lexington, Virginia, and was admitted to the bar in 1908 and commenced practice in Roanoke, Virginia. His father had been Roanoke's first elected Commonwealth's Attorney, and he too served in that capacity, from 1917 to 1919. The Virginia General Assembly then elected Woodrum as a judge of the Roanoke's Hustings Court, where he served from 1919 to 1922.

Woodrum was elected as a Democrat to the Sixty-eighth Congress and re-elected eleven times. He served from March 4, 1923, until his resignation on October 24, 1945 (effective December 31, 1945), to become president of the American Plant Food Council, Inc. Considered a "Southern Progressive" in Washington, Woodrum bucked the powerful Senators Carter Glass and Harry F. Byrd and the Byrd Organization to become an ardent "New Dealer." As a member of the United States House Committee on Appropriations, he steered federal money for the purchase of land for Roanoke's airport, originally called "Woodrum's Field" in his honor, and today known as the Roanoke–Blacksburg Regional Airport. He was also instrumental in bringing the United States Department of Veterans Affairs hospital, now known as the Salem Veterans Affairs Medical Center to his district. The hospital brought many jobs to the region during the Great Depression.

Woodrum was a fierce promoter of his state and region, and very fond of the song, "Carry Me Back to Old Virginny". The song was representative of the commonwealth in many ways. "When Clifton A, Woodrum was in Congress, the House of Representatives couldn't adjourn until the honorable Democrat from Roanoke, Virginia with a rich and varied baritone voice led the body in a rendition of "Carry Me Back to Old Virginny".

Death and legacy

Woodrum died of a heart attack in Washington, D.C., October 6, 1950. He was interred in Fairview Cemetery, Roanoke, Virginia. His son and namesake also became a lawyer in Roanoke, but only survived him by 9 years. His grandson Chip Woodrum continued the family tradition of opposing the Byrd organization, and served in the Virginia House of Delegates, where he became known (among other accomplishments) for updating Virginia's Freedom of Information Act.

The Roanoke-Blacksburg Regional/Woodrum Field Airport (ROA) was activated in May 1930 due to the efforts of Rep. Woodrum to acquire the land and build the facility. It is named in his honor. He was also influential in getting the airport passed as "National Defense Project", opening it up to government funding for improvements. Unbeknownst to Woodrum, his daughter, Martha Ann Woodrum, took flying lessons and became a pilot, as he father did later.

Rep. Woodrum was also instrumental in bringing the Salem Veterans Affairs Medical Center to his district in 1934.

Electoral history

1922; Woodrum was elected to the U.S. House of Representatives with 77.95% of the vote, defeating Republican Fred W. McWane.
1924; Woodrum was re-elected with 69.01% of the vote, defeating Republican McWane.
1926; Woodrum was re-elected unopposed.
1928; Woodrum was re-elected unopposed.
1930; Woodrum was re-elected unopposed.
1932; Woodrum was re-elected along with the Democratic slate in the at-large district; he won 8.39% of the vote in a 24-way race.
1934; Woodrum was re-elected with 67.14% of the vote, defeating Republican Thomas J. Wilson, Jr., Socialist W.L. Gibson, and Independent John Moffett Robinson.
1936; Woodrum was re-elected with 60.69% of the vote, defeating Republican T.X. Parsons.
1938; Woodrum was re-elected with 55.89% of the vote, defeating Republican McWane.
1940; Woodrum was re-elected with 68.14% of the vote, defeating Republican McWane and Socialist Lawrence S. Wilkes.
1942; Woodrum was re-elected with 93.56% of the vote, defeating Republican Stephen A. Moore.
1944; Woodrum was re-elected 69.09% of the vote, defeating Republican John Strickler.

Sources

External links

 

1887 births
1950 deaths
Politicians from Roanoke, Virginia
Virginia lawyers
Virginia state court judges
Democratic Party members of the United States House of Representatives from Virginia
20th-century American judges
20th-century American politicians
20th-century American lawyers they have becca woodrum